Sakhsabay (Saksabay) is a rural locality (a settlement) in Ust-Koksinsky District, the Altai Republic, Russia. The population was 17 as of 2016.

Geography 
Sakhsabay is located 24 km southwest of Ust-Koksa (the district's administrative centre) by road. Ognyovka is the nearest rural locality.

References 

Rural localities in Ust-Koksinsky District